The Dürre Ager is a river of Upper Austria.

The Dürre Ager flows through the  area from south to north passes through St Georgen im Attergau. It joins the Vöckla at Timelkam.

References

Rivers of Upper Austria
Rivers of Austria